Melanie Janine may refer to:

Mel B also known as Melanie Janine Brown (born 1975), English singer 
Melanie Janine Kanaka, Sri Lankan accountant